Coolabah may refer to:-

 Eucalyptus coolabah, a species of Eucalyptus, once considered conspecific with Eucalyptus microtheca
 Eucalyptus microtheca, a species of Eucalyptus, commonly known as coolabah
 , an Australian steamship in service 1952-56
 Coolabah, New South Wales